Coelogyne miniata is a species of orchid.

miniata